Kirka Sharif ( Shrine of the Cloak) is an Islamic shrine located in present-day Kandahar, Afghanistan. The shrine became notable in literature during the Second Anglo-Afghan War, when the British Indian Army were trying to gain influence in Afghanistan. The shrine houses a mantle or cloak, believed to be the cloak of Muhammad, as worn by the Islamic prophet Muhammad during the Night Journey in the year 621.

Cloak of Muhammed 

This cloak or mantle reached Kirka Sharif when it was donated by the Afghan ruler Ahmed Shah Durrani (1722–1773), the father of modern Afghanistan and founder of the Durrani Empire. The sacred Muslim object itself had been given to Ahmed Shah by the amir of Bukhara around 1768. The cloak is said to have been worn by the Islamic prophet Muhammad during the famous Isra' and Mi'raj, or Night Journey, in the year 621. It is one of the most revered relics in the Muslim world.

Friday Mosque 
The shrine is attached to a mosque. The mosque's design follows many principles of Islamic architecture and local customs, with the interior being decorated and carved with green marble from Helmand region of Afghanistan. In addition, it has tiles that are mirrored with gilded detailing. The mosque also has a courtyard and gravestone located on the premises of the shrine. The walls of the shrine are decorated with carvings, common in many Islamic mosques. The carvings of this mosque have trees and other foliage, and the designs are unique to each wall.

Tomb of Ahmed Shah 

Next to the Kirka Sharif is the Tomb of Ahmad Shah Durrani, the founder of the Durrani Empire.

References

External links 
 

Buildings and structures in Kandahar
Islam in Afghanistan
Mosques in Afghanistan